Laine MacNeil (born October 28, 1996) is a Canadian actress. MacNeil made her motion picture debut at the age of thirteen, and is best known for her role as Patty Farrell in the Diary of a Wimpy Kid feature film franchise, which earned her five Young Artist Award nominations, including a win as Best Young Supporting Actress in a Feature Film.

Life and career 

MacNeil was born on October 28, 1996, in Surrey, British Columbia. She attended Lord Tweedsmuir Secondary School. Her brother Donnie is also an actor. She began her acting career at a young age and appeared in her first significant film production in a non-negligible marginal role. In Mr. Troop Mom with all-rounder George Lopez in 2009 she had the role of the Kayla. The following year the young actress came to her international breakthrough when she was cast in the role months before as "Patty Farrell" in the first film adaptation of the successful book series  Diary of a Wimpy Kid.

For her performance in the film, the young Canadian was awarded several times and honoured. So she has received many awards in the Young Artist Awards 2011 nominated for a Young Artist Award in the category "Best Performance in a Feature Film - Supporting Young Actress" on August 3, 2012. In addition, it was with the cast of Diary of a Wimpy Kid, consisting of Peyton List, Karan Brar, Robert Capron, Grayson Russell, Zachary Gordon, and Devon Bostick at the same ceremony with a Young Artist Award in the category "Best Performance in a Feature Film - Young Ensemble Cast".

In 2011, MacNeil followed for numerous other appearances, including among other things a guest appearance on the short-lived Canadian police series Shattered. They also took over in 2011 published the second part of the film, Diary of a Wimpy Kid: Rodrick Rules, again in the role of "Patty Farrell" and was also still in a guest role in the series R. L. Stine's The Haunting Hour: The Series. After these engagements, MacNeil was in the following year again represented at the Young Artist Awards. She received the award of the Young Artist Awards 2012 a nomination in the category "Best Performance in a TV Series - Guest Starring Young Actress 14-16" for her performance in Shattered and was additionally a Young Artist Award in the category "Best Performance in a Feature Film - Supporting Young Actress" for their involvement in Diary of a Wimpy Kid: Rodrick Rules.

In 2012, MacNeil had a guest role on RL Stine's The Haunting Hour and made an appearance in an episode of Falling Skies. In 2012, she played a supporting role in Norman Buckley's directorial debut film The Pregnancy Project and returned to Diary of a Wimpy Kid: Dog Days, where she was nominated to the Young Artist Awards 2013 in the categories of "Best Performance in a TV series - Guest Starring Young Actress 14–16" for her performance in American television series "Falling Skies" and "Best Performance in a Feature Film - Supporting Young Actress" for her performance as Patty Farrell in  Diary of a Wimpy Kid: Dog Days and part of the "Best Performance in a Feature Film - Young Ensemble Cast" where the cast won.

In 2013, she appeared on Canadian-American horror film Horns starring Daniel Radcliffe, where she played the role of young Glenna. Furthermore, that same year she appeared on three episodes of the American crime drama The Killing and again on an episode of R. L. Stine's The Haunting Hour: The Series

In 2014, MacNeil appeared on several TV series such as Almost Human, Motive, and Strange Empire. As well, she appeared on two TV films, The Unauthorized Saved by the Bell Story and Damaged. She was nominated that same year to the 35th Young Artist Awards in the category of "Best Performance in a TV Series - Guest Starring Young Actress 17-21" for her appearance in R. L. Stine's The Haunting Hour and in the category of "Best Performance in a TV Series - Recurring Young Actress 17-21" for her recurring role in The Killing. As well, she worked for a few months as a Fright Night Performer at the Pacific National Exhibition.

She was nominated on 2015 for the 36th Young Artist Awards in the category of "Best Performance in a TV Series - Guest Starring Young Actress 17-21" and the Joey Awards in the category of "Best Actress in a TV Drama Guest Starring Role Age 14-18 Years" for her work on Strange Empire. Outside of acting, MacNeil started to work that same year as a fitness coach in The Dailey Method where she continues to work as of 2020.

Between 2016 and 2017, she had a recurring role on You Me Her's first 2 seasons as Ava Matherfield, Lori's teenage daughter. In 2016, she appeared on On the Farm and The X-Files. In 2017, she was nominated for the Canadian Screen Awards in the category of "Best Performance by an Actress in a Featured Supporting Role or Guest Role in a Comedic Series" for her work on You Me Her. That same year, she appeared on the American movie The Edge of Seventeen, starring Hailee Steinfeld, Woody Harrelson, Kyra Sedgwick and Haley Lu Richardson, playing a TCBY girl. Furthermore, she worked between 2016-2017 as a Belayer in Coastal Climbing Centre.

In 2018, she appeared on Episode 4 of Lee Fraser's podcast Monological.

In 2019, she appeared on Episode 2, "Noise, Noise, Noise" of the American television series Deadly Class, portraying the role of Rory's daughter.

In 2020, she had a supporting role in the American science fiction comedy film Spontaneous, starring Katherine Langford, Charlie Plummer, Hayley Law, Piper Perabo, Rob Huebel and Yvonne Orji, playing the role of Jenna Dalton.

Filmography

Film

Television

Accolades

References

External links 
 
  

1996 births
Living people
21st-century Canadian actresses
Actresses from British Columbia
Canadian film actresses
Canadian television actresses